Two Days is a 2011 Russian romantic comedy-drama film directed by Avdotya Smirnova.

Cast
Fyodor Bondarchuk - Pyotr Drozdov, Deputy Minister of Economy and Development
Kseniya Rappoport - Maria Ilinichna
Evgeny Muravich - Vladimir Nikolayevich Ilyin, Director of the Museum
Irina Rozanova - Larisa Petrovna
Gennady Smirnov - Victor
Konstantin Shelestun - Arkady
Maria Semyonova - Katya
Andrei Smirnov - Minister
Olga Dihovichnaya - Lida
Sergey Umanov - Kharkevich
Boris Kamorzin - Sergei Ivanovich Begletsov, Governor
Yuri Pronin - Chief Engineer

Reception
The film received positive reviews.

It was a winner of two Golden Eagle Awards, for Best Actor (Fyodor Bondarchuk) and Best Actress (Kseniya Rappoport).

References

External links

2011 romantic comedy-drama films
2011 films
Russian romantic comedy-drama films
Films produced by Fyodor Bondarchuk
2010s Russian-language films